The 1988 Individual Speedway World Championship was the 43rd edition of the official World Championship to determine the world champion rider.

The final was held at the Vojens Speedway Center, owned by former World Champion Ole Olsen. Despite the country having won seven World Individual Championships between three riders since 1971 (Olsen, Erik Gundersen and Hans Nielsen), it was the first time Denmark hosted the World Final.

Gundersen renewed his fierce rivalry with Nielsen as both finished on 13 points to tie for the lead of the Championship. However it was Gundersen that won the toss to choose his starting gate for the run-off. He chose the outside and on a wet track he won his third title by defeating Nielsen in the run-off. Fellow Dane Jan O. Pedersen completed a clean sweep for Denmark by taking the bronze medal.

New Zealand Qualification

New Zealand Final

  Christchurch
 Marked in green to Commonwealth Final

Australian Qualification

* Due to the rules, England's Rob Woffinden did not progress to the Australian Championship

Australian Final
 January 23, 1988
  Murray Bridge
 Marked in green to Commonwealth Final

British Qualification

British Final
 May 22, 1988
  Coventry, Brandon Stadium
 First 8 to Commonwealth Final

Swedish Qualification

Swedish Final
 May 17, 18 & 19, 1988
  - 3 Rounds (Malmö, Norrköping & Hallstavik)
 First 3 to Nordic Final plus 1 reserve
 Per Jonsson and Jimmy Nilsen seeded to Nordic Final

Intercontinental Round

Finnish Final
 April 28, 1988
 Karhula
 First to Nordic Final

Danish Final
May 8
 Outrup, Outrup Speedway
First 7 to Nordic final plus 1 reserve

American Final
June 11
 Long Beach, Veterans Memorial Stadium
First 5 to Overseas final plus 1 reserve

Commonwealth Final
June 12
 King's Lynn, Norfolk Arena
First 11 to Overseas Final plus 1 reserve

Overseas Final
July 12
 Coventry, Brandon Stadium
First 9 to Intercontinental Final plus 1 reserve

Nordic Final
July 25
 Sandnes, Sandnes Stadion
First 7 to Intercontinental final plus 1 reserve

Intercontinental Final
August 6
 Vetlanda, Vetlanda Speedway
First 11 to the World Final plus 1 reserve

Continental Qualifications 1989

Austrian Final
  18 June - St. Johann im Pongau, 31 July - Wiener Neustadt, 3 September - Natschbach-Loipersbach
 Marked in green to Continental Qualification 1989

German Final
 October 2, 1988
  Brokstedt
 Marked in green to Continental Qualification 1989

Hungarian Final
 Marked in green to Continental Qualification 1989

Yugoslavian Final
 Marked in green to Continental Qualification 1989

Czechoslovakian Final
 Marked in green to Continental Qualification 1989

USSR Final
 October 2, 1988
  Rovno
 Marked in green to Continental Qualification 1989

Continental Round

Nederlands Final
  3 April - Feyenoord, 26 June, 11 September - Amsterdam, 2 October - Blijham
 Marked in green to Continental Qualification

Continental Final
 August 16, 1988
  Leszno, Alfred Smoczyk Stadium
 First 5 to World Final plus 1 reserve

World Final
 September 3, 1988
  Vojens, Speedway Center

References

1988
Individual
Individual
Speedway competitions in Denmark